Rzedowskia is a monotypic genus of flowering plants belonging to the family Celastraceae. It only contains one known species, Rzedowskia tolantonguensis Medrano 

It is native to eastern Mexico.

The genus name of Rzedowskia is in honour of Jerzy Rzedowski (b. 1926), a Mexican botanist. His focus is on Mexican floristics, taxonomy, and ecology. The Latin specific epithet of tolantonguensis refers to Tolantongo is a box canyon and resort in Hidalgo (state), where the plant was found.
Both the genus and the species were first described and published in Bol. Soc. Bot. México Vol.41 on page 41 in 1981.

In 1997, Sesquiterpenes were extracted from Rzedowskia tolantonguensis.

References

Celastraceae
Celastrales genera
Plants described in 1981
Flora of Northeastern Mexico
Flora of Veracruz